George III (born on May 25, 1949 under the name of Georgios Papachrysostomou in Athienou) is the current Archbishop of Cyprus since 8 January 2023.

He had been the Metropolitan of the Diocese of Paphos since 2006 and, from November 7, 2022, the locum tenens of the Church of Cyprus. On 24 December 2022, he was elected Archbishop of Cyprus. He "formally assumed his new duties" starting Sunday, 8 January 2023, after the enthronement ceremony at Saint Barnabas Cathedral in Nicosia, Cyprus.

Early Life 
George was born in Athienou in 1949, a village in Cyprus. He studied chemistry at the Kapodistrian University of Athens between 1968 and 1972, then he took theology courses there between 1976 and 1980. On December 23, 1984, he was ordained deacon in the Church of Cyprus and May 17, 1985, priest and Archimandrite by Archbishop Chrysostomos I of Cyprus.

Clerical Career 
In 1994, he became Secretary of the Holy Synod of the Church of Cyprus. Alongside his ecclesiastical duties, he served as a chemistry teacher in Cypriot high schools. He was arrested and abused by the Turkish occupation troops in Cyprus and lodged an appeal in 1989 against Turkey at the European Court of Human Rights (n° 15300/891), which resulted in Turkey's first conviction. (507/3.2.94) for violation of human rights in Cyprus.

In 1996, he was elected Bishop of Arsinois. 

On December 29, 2006, he was unanimously elected to replace Chrysostomos II of Cyprus as Metropolitan of Paphos. In the meantime, he became head of ecumenical affairs for the Church of Cyprus as well as head of its bioethics committee.

2022 Archiepiscopal election 

On November 7, 2022, following the death of Chrysostomos II of Cyprus, he became locum tenens of the Church of Cyprus pending the episcopal election which were to determine the next archbishop. He announced the Archbishop's death on Cypriot and Greek television and called on all the faithful to pay their last respects to the remains of the late Archbishop.

Chrysostomos II was buried on November 12, 2022 in the Cathedral of the Apostle Barnabas in Nicosia, where the Archbishops of Cyprus are buried. The ceremony was presided by George of Paphos and participated, among others, the President of Cyprus, Ecumenical Patriarch Bartholomew I, the Patriarch of Alexandria, the Archbishop of Greece and the President of Greece.

He was responsible for organizing the proper holding of the 2022 Cypriot archiepiscopal election.

Archbishop of Cyprus 
On 24 December 2022, he was elected Archbishop of Cyprus by the Holy Synod, with 11 votes in favor out of the 16. The Archbishop's enthronement ceremony took place on Sunday, 08 January 2023, at Saint Barnabas Cathedral in Nicosia, Cyprus. In his address, he stated that his goal is to "reinvigorate the Christian message in modern spiritual discourse", continue the "Church’s outreach to the poor", and "convey that scientific thought isn’t in conflict with the precepts of Christianity".

Notes and references 

Archbishops of Cyprus
1949 births
People from Larnaca District
National and Kapodistrian University of Athens alumni